Stuart Carrington (born 14 May 1990) is an English professional snooker player. He practises frequently with Steven Hallworth and Ian Glover in Grimsby.

In May 2011, Carrington qualified for the 2011–12 professional Main Tour as one of four semi-finalists from the third and final Q School event.

Career

Debut season
Carrington won just two matches during the 2011/2012 season. He finished the season without a world ranking and would not play on the main tour in the 2012–13 season.

2012/2013 season
Carrington played in eight out of twelve PTC events during the 2012–13 season, with his best results being last 32 defeat at the 2012 Scottish Open earned him a place in the EBSA Qualifying Tour Play-offs. At the event Carrington beat Jeff Cundy 4–2 and Adam Wicheard 4–0 to claim a place back on the snooker tour for the 2013–14 season and 2014–15 season.

2013/2014 season
Carrington beat Ken Doherty 6–3 to qualify for the International Championship. In his debut at a ranking event he defeated Michael Leslie 6–4, before losing 6–3 to Mark Davis in the second round. At the UK Championship, Carrington enjoyed 6–2 and 6–1 wins over Ben Woollaston and John Astley, but was then whitewashed 6–0 by Mark Selby. He met Selby once more in the first round of the China Open and lost 5–3. Carrington came close to qualifying for the World Championship as he saw off Andrew Norman 10–5, Jack Lisowski 10–7 and Nigel Bond 10–5 to reach the final round, where Ryan Day beat him 10–5.

2014/2015 season
Carrington lost in the first round of the UK Championship and Welsh Open 6–3 to Nigel Bond and 4–3 to Marcus Campbell respectively. He reached the second round of the Indian Open due to Marco Fu's withdrawal and was beaten 4–1 by Li Hang, with his solitary frame coming courtesy of a 138 break which was the highest of the tournament. In World Championship qualifying, Carrington defeated Joel Walker 10–6 and Peter Ebdon 10–7 to reach the final round for the second year in a row. He made a century break to force a decider against Li Hang which Carrington won and he made his debut in the event against Judd Trump. Carrington lost the first session 7–2 and then won three of the first four frames of the second, but went on to be beaten 10–6, despite coming close to making his first Crucible century with efforts of 99 and 97. Carrington broke into the top 64 in the end of season rankings as the world number 63.

2015/2016 season
At the Paul Hunter Classic Carrington knocked out Tony Drago, Mike Dunn, Matthew Stevens and Mark Davis to reach the quarter-finals of a professional event for the first time, where he lost 4–2 to Shaun Murphy. Murphy also ended his tournament at the last 16 of the Bulgarian Open and Carrington would go on to finish 34th on the European Order of Merit. He held on from 4–1 up on Liam Highfield to win 6–4 in the first round of the UK Championship, before losing 6–3 to Judd Trump. After narrowly overcoming Jamie Cope 5–4, Carrington beat five-time world champion Ronnie O'Sullivan 5–3 to qualify for the German Masters. There, he squandered a 3–0 lead over Mark King to lose 5–4. He also lost in the second round of the Welsh Open 4–1 to Neil Robertson. Carrington qualified for the China Open but was forced to withdraw from the event due to illness.

2016/2017 season
Carrington won three matches to qualify for the Shanghai Masters and, after coming through a wildcard round, he was 4–2 down to Joe Perry. However, he then restricted Perry to just seven points as he knocked in breaks of 78, 85 and 100 to progress 5–4. In the second round he was beaten 5–3 by Mark Selby. At the Welsh Open, Carrington defeated Sam Craigie 4–2, Wang Yuchen 4–2, Robin Hull 4–0 and Igor Figueiredo 4–1 to make it to the first ranking event quarter-final of his career and was 4–0 behind to Stuart Bingham. Carrington rallied to trail by a single frame, but lost a long eighth in a 5–3 defeat. Carrington eliminated Alex Borg 10–2, Andrew Higginson 10–6 and Mark Williams 10–7 to qualify for his second World Championship and he played Liang Wenbo in the first round. From 2–2, Carrington made three centuries in a row, before his lead was cut to 5–4 after the first session. He became the fifth player to have made three successive tons at the Crucible after John Higgins, Ronnie O'Sullivan, Mark Selby and Neil Robertson. The second session lacked the quality of the first with Liang triumphing 10–7.

Performance and rankings timeline

Career finals

Pro-am finals: 1 (1 title)

Amateur finals: 2 (2 titles)

References

External links
Stuart Carrington at worldsnooker.com

English snooker players
Living people
1990 births
Sportspeople from Grimsby